The 2014–15 All-Ireland Senior Club Football Championship was the 45th annual  gaelic football tournament since its establishment in 1970.

Corofin won the title after a 1–14 to 0–7 win against Slaughtneil in the final.

Provincial championships

Leinster Senior Club Football Championship

First round

Quarter-finals

Semi-finals

Final

Ulster Senior Club Football Championship

Preliminary round

Quarter-finals

Semi-finals

Final

Connacht Senior Club Football Championship

Quarter-final

Semi-finals

Final

Munster Senior Club Football Championship

Quarter-finals

Semi-finals

Final

All-Ireland Senior Club Football Championship

Quarter-final

Semi-finals

Final

Championship statistics

Top scorers

Overall

In a single game

Miscellaneous

 The Wexford SFC champions St. Anne's Rathangan did not compete in this years championship as the Wexford Senior Championship had not reached completion by the date of their Leinster SCFC preliminary round tie. Hence, Portlaoise were granted a walkover.

References

All-Ireland Senior Club Football Championship
All-Ireland Senior Club Football Championship
All-Ireland Senior Club Football Championship